The 1869 Connecticut gubernatorial election was held on April 5, 1869. It was a rematch of the 1868 Connecticut gubernatorial election. Republican nominee Marshall Jewell defeated incumbent governor and Democratic nominee James E. English with 50.22% of the vote.

General election

Candidates
Major party candidates

Marshall Jewell, Republican
James E. English, Democratic

Results

References

1869
Connecticut
Gubernatorial